Butson is a surname. Notable people with the surname include:

Christopher Butson, Church of Ireland bishop
Christopher Butson (priest), Irish Anglican priest
Matthew Butson, New Zealand Paralympic alpine skier
Richard Butson, Canadian surgeon

See also
Butson Ridge, a ridge of Antarctica
Butson-type Hadamard matrix